Charles Harriott Smith (1792–1864)  was an English architect and architectural sculptor involved in several prestigious projects, ranging from the National Gallery to the Houses of Parliament. His iconic works include the capital of Nelson's Column supporting the statue by Edward Hodges Baily.

His work was influenced by Johann Joachim Winckelmann and architectural work was largely in the Neo-Hellenic style. Despite his undisputed contribution to London's architecture he tends to be a little-known figure.

Life

He was born in London on 1 February 1792, the son of Joseph Smith, a monumental sculptor with premises at 5 Portland Road near Regents Park. Charles left school in 1804 to start an apprenticeship in his father's yard. During his time there he met and befriended Joseph Bonomi (who presumably used the stone yard for supplies or for sculptors). Bonomi encouraged Charles to join the Royal Academy School in 1814. There he won the Gold Medal for Architecture in 1817. He exhibited at the Royal Academy from 1809 to 1823.

He studied geology, mineralogy and chemistry and was an expert on stone in a manner which greatly benefited the durability of his work. Due to this expertise, Sir Charles Barry consulted him on the project to rebuild the Houses of Parliament to chose stone most likely to survive the centuries. Smith and Barry formed part of the Royal Commission charged with sourcing sufficient building stone of the same type and quality to befit this huge project. This involved a tour of British quarries and of some of the better preserved abbeys and cathedrals of the country. They (and the two other geologists on the Commission: Henry de la Beche and William Smith) ultimately chose a Yorkshire Magnesian Limestone from a large quarry at Anston.

There is reference to his also being involved with hothouse design.

From 1851 he lived at 29 Clipstone Street, Fitzroy Square in London. In 1855 he was elected a member of the Royal Institute of British Architects.

He died at 24 Hatton Garden in London, where he had lived since 1861, on 27 October 1864.

Principal works

Corinthian columns and architectural detail for portico at University College, London (1826)
Portico, National Gallery, London (1823)
Portico, Royal Exchange, London (1837)
Bridgewater House, Westminster (1848) for Sir Charles Barry
Dorchester House (1852) demolished 1929
The capital of Nelson's Column (1850)
Chapel at City of London Cemetery (1853)
Museum of Practical Geology, Jermyn Street (1845)

Funerary work

Obelisk to William Staveley, Kensal Green Cemetery (1837)
Tomb of Edward Scriven, Kensal Green Cemetery (1842)
Grave of A R Freebairn (1847) Highgate Cemetery
Grave of Jonathan Pereira (1853) Kensal Green Cemetery

Other works

Bust of Rev Edward J Turnour of Hambledon, Hampshire
"Farnese Hercules" at the Geological Museum
Monument to Giles Earle (1811) at Hendon, Middlesex
Monument to Nathaniel Crichton (1814) at Hendon, Middlesex
Monument to Robert Cotton (1821) at Reigate in Surrey
Lt Col Fitzgerald (1821) St Marylebone Parish Church
Rebecca Phipps (1830) St Marylebone Parish Church
Henry Moreton Dyer (1841) St Marylebone Parish Church
Countess Beauchamp (1846) St Marylebone Parish Church
Elizabeth Peters (1822) in Badby
John Francis (1824) in Badby
Lt General George Deare (1823) St John's Wood Chapel
Charles Higginson (1824) in Madras Cathedral
Margaret Randall (1824) at Erith in Kent
Monument to the Stuckey family (1824) in Langport, Somerset
Rev Charles Tower (1825) at South Weald in Essex
William Sleigh (1825) at Stockton, Durham
Georgina Chamier (1826) at Stoke-next-Guildford in Surrey
Anthony Parker (1827) at Churchgate Street in Essex
Rev Edward Meyrick (1839) at Ramsbury
Richard Alsager (1841) at Tooting
Rev Francis Goode (1842) in Clapham Parish Church
John Garden (1855) at Ringsfield in Suffolk
Henry Hickman (1855) at Newnham, Hampshire

Publications by Smith

Lithology or Observations on Stones used for Buildings (1842)

Family

He married as his second wife, Fanny Riviere, daughter of Daniel Riviere, both distinguished miniaturists. Their children included:

William Riviere Smith (1806-1876) an artist
Henry Parsons Riviere Smith (1811-1888) a watercolorist
Robert Riviere Smith (1808-1882) a book-binder
Percy Gordon Smith, architect

References

1792 births
1864 deaths
People from London
British sculptors
British geologists